Love Story (4 Season Project 季) is the fourth extended play by South Korean singer and Super Junior member, Kyuhyun. The EP was released on January 25, 2022, by Label SJ, SM Entertainment and distributed by Dreamus Company, in Korea. It contains six tracks in total, which were released as a four-season project from 2020 to 2022. The release of the EP marked the finale of Project: 季.

Background 
Kyuhyun announced the release of Love Story (4 Season Project 季) at midnight on January 10, 2022, on Super Junior's Twitter account. He stated in the video uploaded via Twitter Media Studio that the track "Love Story" would conclude the series and aims to stimulate the emotions within a relationship during winter.

For this project, Kyuhyun wanted the listener to experience the different moods of love and genres representing each season.

Each of the music videos for "Love Story", "Coffee", "Together" and "Moving On" gives the audience a snippet of the love story between two schoolmates who stuck together until they became adults. The music videos starred actor Gong Myung and actress Chae Soo-bin.

Separately, the music video for "Daystar" starred Hospital Playlist actor Yoo Yeon-seok. Kyuhyun has known the actor through variety shows, working together in the musical Werther, and also sang the OST "Confession is Not Flashy" for the drama Hospital Playlist.

Composition 
The EP opens with "Love Story". It is a ballad song about yearning for a lover though the relationship is already part of the past. The lyrics speak about reminiscing the memories of a past relationship, as if flipping through a novel. Each track has an epilogue, in which all six tracks string together a storyline, in line with the title of the EP Love Story.

Packaging 
The Love Story (4 Season Project 季) physical album consists of two versions: "Letter" and "Story". The albums are structured like a novel with chapters, including pictures of Kyuhyun from photoshoots of the different music video locations, and each version comes with a bookmark.

Track listing

Charts

Weekly charts

Monthly charts

References

External links 
 Kyuhyun's official website | SMTOWN Official Musician biography
 'Love Story' MV Teaser #1
 'Love Story' MV Teaser #2
 'Love Story' album promotional comeback live

Cho Kyuhyun EPs
2022 EPs
Korean-language EPs
SM Entertainment EPs